Judit Schlégl-Blaumann (born 23 January 1945) is a Hungarian volleyball player. She competed at the 1972 Summer Olympics and the 1976 Summer Olympics.

References

1945 births
Living people
Hungarian women's volleyball players
Olympic volleyball players of Hungary
Volleyball players at the 1972 Summer Olympics
Volleyball players at the 1976 Summer Olympics
Volleyball players from Budapest